Yves Morvan (French:iv moʁɑ̃; born January 13, 1932, in Uzel) is a French archaeologist, specialist of the romanesque art and of the iconography of Blaise Pascal. He is also a restorer, sculptor of religious characters,  as well as member of the Academy of Science, Literature and Arts of Clermont-Ferrand.

Biography

During more than 40 years he worked on the medieval art from Auvergne. His works are quoted by numerous experts in various books. He undertook an important work of archaeology and discovered numerous murals in the churches of the region. He realized more than three hundred archeological explorations and restorations of romanesque murals.
In its novel " La chapelle des damnés " Samuel Gance named the main character Ivo Varmon which is Yves Morvan's anagram.
In 2015, in a book on the colors harmony, he denounces The Michel-Eugène Chevreul's Laws of Contrast of Colour.

Books
 Yves Morvan, Pascal à Mirefleurs ? Les dessins de la maison de Domat, Courrier du Centre International Blaise Pascal, 6, 1984.
 Yves Morvan, La peste noire à Jenzat, in Bulletin historique et scientifique de l'Auvergne, Clermont-Ferrand, vol. 92, n° 682, 1984.
 Yves Morvan, La maison de l'Éléphant, Bulletin historique et scientifique de l'Auvergne, vol. 92, n° 683, 1984.
 Yves Morvan, Ezio Arduini, Pascal à Mirefleurs ? Les dessins de la maison de Domat, Impr. Blandin, 1985.(FRBNF40378895)
 Yves Morvan, Montfermy : les peintures murales du sanctuaire, Bulletin historique et scientifique de l'Auvergne, vol. 93, n°689, 1986.
 Yves Morvan, Pascal d'après nature, Bulletin historique et scientifique de l'Auvergne, tome XCIII, n° 692-693, 1987.
 Yves Morvan, Récentes découvertes de peintures murales dans l'église Saint-Martin de Jenzat (Allier), Société Française d'Archéologie, Congrès archéologique de France, 146ème session, Bourbonnais, 1988.
 Yves Morvan, Bruno Saunier, Peintures murales du XIIe au XVIIIe (principaux sites), Association pour l'Étude et la Mise en Valeur du Patrimoine Auvergnat, 1989.
 Yves Morvan, Images anciennes et nouvelles de Blaise Pascal, souvenir de l’exposition, Courrier du Centre International Blaise Pascal, 13, 1991.
 Yves Morvan, Les peintures de la salle capitulaire d'Issoire, Revue d'Auvergne, Volume 106, Numéro 3. Société des amis de l'Université de Clermont. Ed. G. Mont-Louis, 1992.()
 Yves Morvan, Des témoins ressuscités, Monuments historiques, n° 197, 1995.
 Yves Morvan, Une page de l'histoire des chemins de Saint-Jacques en Haute-Auvergne in Vivre en moyenne montagne: Éditions du CTHS, 1995
 Yves Morvan, Les peintures intérieures, Bulletin n°26 de l'association des amis du vieux Pont-du-Château, 1995.
 Yves Morvan, Et c'est ainsi qu'Anna est grande... Découverte de peintures murales dans l'église Saint-Vincent de Saint-Flour, Bulletin historique et scientifique de l'Auvergne, tome XCIX, 1998.
 Catherine Lonchambon, Yves Morvan, Des peintures murales inattendues et insolites: Merveilles de l'église de Pignols. Histoire et Images médiévales. n°47,2003.
 Yves Morvan, La Sirène et la luxure; Communication du Colloque "La luxure et le corps dans l'art roman". Mozac. 2008.
 Hélène Leroy, Francis Debaisieux, Yves Morvan, Vierges romanes-Portraits croisés, Éditions Debaisieux, 2009.().
 Yves Morvan, La vision et l'harmonie des couleurs (Nouveaux regards), Éditions Ex Aequo, 2015.()
 Yves Morvan, Le Christ noir de Saint-Flour, Bulletin historique et scientifique de l’Auvergne, 2017.
 Yves Morvan, White paint and black color in the Middle Ages, International Colour Association (AIC) Conference 2020.

Archeological works
 Frescoes of the romanesque church of Orléat.
 Murals of the Aigueperse church.
 Murals of the Cathedral Notre-Dame-de-l'Assomption of Clermont-Ferrand.
 Frescoes of the 14th century in the Romanesque church of Beurières.
 Saint-Léger church of Montfermy.
 Saint-Martin church of Jaleyrac.
 Murals of the XVIth in the Charraix church.
 Michael and a hunting scene on the south wall of the Ris church.
 Murals of the church of Pignols.
 Saint Vincent church of Saint-Flour.
 Saint Vincent Convent of Saint-Flour: scene with Saint James.
 Saint Bartholomew's church in Saint-Amant-Roche-Savine.
 Restoration and discovery of new blazons in the " Room of States " of the Château de Ravel.

Exhibitions and works

 Dix ans de découvertes et de restauration, Pignols church. July–August 1992.
 Art Sacré, Sellier Gallery, Aurillac. November–December 2007.
 Images anciennes et nouvelles de Blaise Pascal. Espace municipal Pierre Laporte, Jaude Centre. Clermont-Ferrand. 1990.
 Painting of the "Ici sévit Mandrin" fresco on the Mandrin' door in Brioude.
 Copies of the romanesque virgins of Saint-Victor-la-Rivière, of Chassignolles, of the Forez, of Colamine-sous-Vodable, of Usson, among others.

References
 Anne Courtillé, La Cathédrale de Clermont, Créer, 1994
 Louis Passelaigue, Histoire des rues de Clermont et Montferrand, De Borée, 1997
 Anne Courtillé, Auvergne, Bourbonnais, Velay gothiques: les édifices religieux, Picard, 2002
 Anne Courtillé, Auvergne et Bourbonnais gothiques, Volume 1, Créer, 1991
 Bulletin d'histoire bénédictine, vol.12. Abbaye de Maredsous, 1991.
 Léon Pressouyre et collectif, Vivre en moyenne montagne : Comité des Travaux Historiques et Scientifiques, Éditions du CTHS, 1995
 Société des amis de l'Université de Clermont, La Vierge à l'époque romane: culte et représentations : Revue d'Auvergne, Volume 111, Typ. et lithog. G. Mont-Louis, 1997
 Thérèse Goyet, L'accès aux Pensées de Pascal : colloque scientifique et pédagogique tenu à Clermont-Ferrand, Klincksieck, 1993
 Société d'histoire ecclésiastique de la France. Revue d'histoire de l'église de France, Volume 79, Numéros 202 à 203. 1993.
 Centre européen d'art et de civilisation médiévale, Société des lettres, sciences et arts de l'Aveyron. Enfer et paradis: l'au-delà dans l'art et la littérature en Europe : actes du colloque. Ed. Le centre. 1995.
 Heidrun Stein-Kecks, Heidrun Stein, Der Kapitelsaal in der mittelalterlichen Klosterbaukunst: Studien zu den Bildprogrammen, Deutscher Kunstverlag, 2004
 Académie des sciences, belles-lettres et arts de Clermont-Ferrand, Bulletin historique et scientifique de l'Auvergne, Numéros 732 à 735, Académie des sciences, belles-lettres et arts de Clermont-Ferrand, 1997
 Société Française d'Archéologie, Bulletin Monumental, t. 156, 1998
 Académie des sciences, belles-lettres et arts de Clermont-Ferrand, Bulletin historique et scientifique de l'Auvergne, Numéros 736 à 739, Académie des sciences, belles-lettres et arts de Clermont-Ferrand, 1998
 Société Française d'Archéologie, Congrès archéologique de France, vol. 158, 2003
 Anne Courtillé, Histoire de la peinture murale dans l'Auvergne du Moyen Âge, Watel Editions, 2000
 Brigitte Mézard, Bruno Saunier, Musée national du Luxembourg (France), Les Majestés du Cantal: images de la Vierge en Haute-Auvergne, Conseil général du Cantal, 1992, 201 p.
 Bruno Phalip, Auvergne et Bourbonnais gothiques: le cadre civil, Picard, 2003, 263 p.
 Anne Courtillé, Marie en Auvergne, Bourbonnais et Velay, De Borée, 1997
 Annie Regond, La peinture murale du 16e siècle dans la région auvergne, Institut d'études du Massif Central, 1983
 Dominique de Larouzière-Montlosier, L'invention romane en Auvergne: de la poutre à la voûte (fin Xe-XIe siècle), Institut d'études du Massif Central, 2003
 Università di Perugia. Centro di studi sulla spiritualità medievale, La pesta nera: dati di una realtà ed elementi di una interpretazione, Fondazione CISAM, 1994
 Société d'histoire ecclésiastique de la France, Revue d'histoire de l'Église de France, Vol. 71 à 72, Société d'histoire ecclésiastique de la France, 1985
 Getty Research Institute, CNRS-INIST, Bibliography of the history of art: BHA, Volume 4, Numéro 2, Centre national de la recherche scientifique, Institut de l'information scientifique et technique, 1994
 Sandrine Delvert-Billaud, La peinture murale de la fin du moyen âge, Ed. du Centre international d'art mural, 2000, p. 38.

Example of an archaeological discovery and restoration of a mural painting in Saint-Amant-Roche-Savine

References 

1932 births
French archaeologists
Living people
People from Côtes-d'Armor